Ayigbe biscuit is a Ghanaian snack created by Yonunawo Kwami Edze from Agbozume in the Volta Region.

History 
The biscuit was manufactured by Yonunawo Kwami Edze from Agbozome in the Volta Region. Yonunawo Kwami Edze introduced the biscuit to the Agbozome community when she returned from the Ivory Coast as a baker in 1907. She was able to use the skills she learnt to make Ayigbe biscuits. Production of this snack lends itself to being economically viable, as Yonunawo Kwami Edze trained women on how to prepare the biscuit in order to make a living.

Ingredient 
Ingredients used in the preparation of Ayigbe biscuit:
 Cassava starch
 Coconut
 Sugar
 Salt 
 Water

Preparation 
Mix ingredients together and bake it in the oven. The biscuits become brownish white after fully baked.

References

External links 

 How to prepare Ayigbe Biscuit

Ghanaian cuisine